Round Hill Airport was an airfield operational from 1927-1936. The airfield was described as being located on land owned by Edward Howland Robinson Green in Dartmouth, Massachusetts.

References

Defunct airports in Massachusetts
Airports in Bristol County, Massachusetts